Ainu or Aynu may refer to:
Ainu people, an East Asian ethnic group of Japan and the Russian Far East
Ainu languages, a family of languages
Ainu language of Hokkaido
Kuril Ainu language, extinct language of the Kuril Islands
Sakhalin Ainu language, extinct language from the island of Sakhalin
Ainu music
Ainu cuisine
Ainu (Middle-earth), spirit in J. R. R. Tolkien's legendarium
Ainu (insect), a beetle in the family Tenebrionidae
Äynu people, of Western China
Äynu language

See also
Äynu (disambiguation)
Ainur (disambiguation)
Aino (disambiguation)

Language and nationality disambiguation pages